Whitehall Borough is a defunct borough that was located in Philadelphia County, Pennsylvania. The borough ceased to exist when it was incorporated into the City of Philadelphia on the passage of the Act of Consolidation, 1854.

History
The area takes its name from White Hall, a grand mansion built there by Jesse Waln.

When it was incorporated into a borough on April 9, 1849, it covered what today is called East Frankford, between the Little Tacony (or Tackawanna) and Frankford Creeks, including Frankford and Bridesburg Stations on the former Pennsylvania Railroad, Whitehall Commons, and the Frankford Arsenal. It lay northwest of Bridesburg Borough, and southeast of Frankford Borough. It was situated in the old township of Tacony and the later Northern Liberties Township.

In 1853, the part of Whitehall that lay between Torresdale Avenue and Frankford Creek and below what is now Whitehall Commons was ceded to the borough of Frankford, leaving it with an area of only 0.471 square mile.

References

Resources
Chronology of the Political Subdivisions of the County of Philadelphia, 1683-1854
Incorporated Districts, Boroughs, and Townships in the County of Philadelphia, 1854 By Rudolph J. Walther, excerpted at ushistory.org

Municipalities in Philadelphia County prior to the Act of Consolidation, 1854
1849 establishments in Pennsylvania
1854 disestablishments in Pennsylvania